The 1984 World Cup took place 14–18 November at the Olgiata Golf Club, located 15 miles north of Rome, Italy. It was the 31st World Cup event. The tournament was a stroke play team event with 33 teams and was shortened from 72 holes to 54 holes, since the first day of play was cancelled, two hours after it started, due to heavy rain. Each team consisted of two players from a country. The combined score of each team determined the team results. The Spain team of José María Cañizares and José Rivero won by eight strokes over the  Taiwan team of  Chen Tse-chung and Hsieh Min-nan.  It was the fourth Spanish victory in the last eight World Cup tournaments. The individual competition for The International Trophy, was won by Cañizares two strokes ahead of Gordon Brand Jnr, Scotland. Three players also competed as individuals: Roberto De Vicenzo of Argentina, Mohamed Said Moussa of Egypt, and John Jacobs of the United States.

Teams

Scores 
Team

International Trophy

Sources:

References

World Cup (men's golf)
Golf tournaments in Italy
Sports competitions in Rome
World Cup golf
World Cup golf
World Cup golf
1980s in Rome